(14 February 1900 - 18 May 1952) was a Japanese aesthetician, film theorist, librarian, and social activist.

Career
Born in Hiroshima Prefecture, Nakai studied philosophy at Kyoto University, particularly aesthetics under Yasukazu Fukuda. He started the dōjinshi Bi hihyō in 1930, which changed its name to Sekai bunka in 1935. He became a lecturer at Kyoto University while being active in left-wing social movements, protesting Japan's tilt towards fascism and promoting popular forms of culture through such concepts at the "logic of the committee."

Nakai co-founded the popular culture tabloid Doyōbi (Saturday) in 1936. However, the magazine was discontinued in 1937 with his arrest for anti-fascist political activity under the Peace Preservation Law. Nakai also his university position as a result of the arrest. After World War II, he continued his political activism by teaching philosophy as part of the Hiroshima Culture Movement and by running for governor of Hiroshima Prefecture, only losing by a narrow margin. He was appointed the first Vice Librarian (fukukanchō) of the National Diet Library in 1948.

Selected bibliography

References

External links
Nakai Masakazu at Aozora Bunko (in Japanese)

Japanese philosophers
Film theorists
1900 births
1952 deaths
Philosophers of art
People from Hiroshima Prefecture
Japanese activists
Japanese anti-fascists
Japanese politicians
Japanese librarians
Kyoto University alumni
Academic staff of Kyoto University
20th-century Japanese philosophers